Kristina Pantelić (born 9 October 1997) is a Serbian footballer who plays as a midfielder for French club Saint-Étienne and the Serbia national team.

International career
Pantelić has been capped for the Serbia national team, appearing for the team during the 2019 FIFA Women's World Cup qualifying cycle.

References

External links
 
 
 
 
 Kristina Pantelić at Footofeminin.fr

1997 births
Living people
Sportspeople from Valjevo
Serbian women's footballers
Women's association football midfielders
ŽFK Crvena zvezda players
ASPTT Albi players
AS Saint-Étienne (women) players
Division 1 Féminine players
Serbia women's international footballers
Serbian expatriate footballers
Expatriate women's footballers in France
Serbian expatriate sportspeople in France